Adenanthos flavidiflorus is a shrub of the family Proteaceae native to Western Australia.

References

Eudicots of Western Australia
flavidiflorus
Plants described in 1859
Taxa named by Ferdinand von Mueller